The 1990–91 Arizona State Sun Devils men's basketball team represented Arizona State University as a member of the Pacific-10 Conference during the 1990–91 NCAA Division I men's basketball season. They were led by head coach Bill Frieder, in his 2nd season, and played their home games at the ASU Activity Center in Tempe, Arizona.

Roster

Schedule and results

|-
!colspan=9 style=| Non-conference regular season

|-
!colspan=9 style=| Pac-10 Regular Season

|-
!colspan=9 style=| NCAA Tournament

Source:

References 

Arizona State
Arizona State Sun Devils
Arizona State Sun Devils men's basketball seasons
Arizona State Sun Devils
Arizona State